Irina Khromacheva and Maryna Zanevska were the defending champions. Zanevska did not compete in the event, but Khromacheva retained her title alongside new partner Daria Gavrilova, with the Russian pair defeating Montserrat González and Beatriz Haddad Maia in the final, 4–6, 6–4, [10–8].

Seeds

Draw

Finals

Top half

Bottom half

References 
 Draw

Girls' Doubles
French Open, 2012 Girls' Doubles